Suppression of Enemy Air Defenses (SEAD, pronounced ), also known in the United States as "Wild Weasel" and (initially) "Iron Hand" operations, are military actions to suppress enemy surface-based air defenses, including not only surface-to-air missiles (SAMs) and anti-aircraft artillery (AAA) but also interrelated systems such as early-warning radar and command, control and communication (C3) functions, while also marking other targets to be destroyed by an air strike. Suppression can be accomplished both by physically destroying the systems or by disrupting and deceiving them through electronic warfare. In modern warfare, SEAD missions can constitute as much as 30% of all sorties launched in the first week of combat and continue at a reduced rate through the rest of a campaign. One quarter of American combat sorties in recent conflicts have been SEAD missions. Despite generally being associated with aircraft, SEAD missions may be performed using any means, including through actions by ground forces.

Primitive operations akin to SEAD emerged during the Second World War, during which multiple participants made attempts to degrade enemy ground radar stations. However, SEAD missions performed by dedicated aircraft first undertook combat missions during the Vietnam War, the United States Air Force's EF-105F/F-105G Thunderchief and United States Navy's A-6B Intruder being amongst these pioneers; Operation Linebacker intentionally incorporated SEAD actions to improve the survivability of bombers and increase overall effectiveness. Other early conflicts that saw SEAD missions conducted included the 1982 Falklands War, over Port Stanley, and the 1982 Lebanon War, in the Beqaa Valley. The tactical awareness, or lack thereof, of air defense operators proved to be a decisive factor in the success rate of these missions. The 1986 United States bombing of Libya, while Libya's integrated air defense network was not destroyed, it was damaged without major losses incurred by US forces.

During the 1990s, extensive use of SEAD was made, particularly during the Gulf War of the early 1990s. Intense aerial attacks of Iraq's integrated air defenses were conducted during Operation Instant Thunder, the Coalition's aerial attacks at the start of the conflict; Iraqi SAM operators regularly resorted to firing missiles with minimal or no guidance due to fears that radar use brought quick retaliation.
All Iraqi air defenses in the south were destroyed, although the skies remained unsafe for low altitude flight. In the 1999 NATO bombing of Yugoslavia, the defender's air defences proved to be less vulnerable and more effective; although only two aircraft were reportedly lost to Yugoslavian SAMs, the downing of a F-117A Nighthawk marked the first combat loss ever of a stealth aircraft. In the Iraq War of the 2000s, coalition aircraft repeatedly targeted Iraqi SAMs during the opening phase of the conflict, despite this, aerial strikes were usually performed from stand-off distances to avoid these defenses, and low level flight was avoided. In the 2022 Russian invasion of Ukraine, while many Ukrainian air defence facilities were reportedly destroyed or damaged in the first days of the war by Russian air strikes, Russia may not have been able to gain aerial superiority; it has been alleged that Ukrainian mid-range SAM sites have forced planes to fly low, but this makes them vulnerable to shoulder-launched surface-to-air missiles.

History

Pre-Vietnam War
Prior to the Vietnam War, SEAD was an undefined mission: although attempts to destroy enemy air defense sites were undertaken, they were done so on an individual aircraft basis and in relation to specific targets or operations rather than as part of an overall strategy or doctrine of defense suppression. While crude, these tactics were frequently effective for their time.

World War II
During the Battle of Britain, the German Luftwaffe attempted to destroy Great Britain's Chain Home radar stations in order to degrade the British air defense network. However, German High Command failed to realize the efficiency of not only the radar stations themselves but the command and control system directing Britain's air defenses. After initial optimism regarding the radar sites' destruction, it was eventually decided to halt these attacks altogether except for exceptional circumstances. As the air war in Europe shifted in favor of the Allies, the Germans relied heavily on their AAA to defend against bombing attacks. This was borne out in Allied aircraft losses between 1943 and 1944, where losses to enemy fighters were cut in half but losses to flak increased tenfold.

Understanding the importance of Germany's radar sites, the Allies directed attacks against these installations and introduced new technology to counteract the effects of radar-directed AAA, including CARPET (US) and WINDOW (UK). A change in tactics saw bomber formations flying higher and more spread out to avoid the effects of flak. Bombing missions were also carried out to accomplish the physical destruction of AAA sites, using imagery intelligence to locate the weapons and employing both heavy bombers and fighter-bombers to destroy them. The P-47 Thunderbolt in particular was chosen for this task due to its ability to survive enemy fire. The effect of these missions varied, with losses suffered by fighter-bombers much higher—up to 40% in some cases—on account of their low-altitude attacks. Artillery also played a major role in suppressing air defenses, with the British Army the first to develop what became known as counterflak or "Apple Pie" missions. These missions were first employed to limited effect during the Battle of France but matured as the war progressed. The largest SEAD mission in history took place on March 24, 1945, when artillery forces of the British XII Corps attempted to knock out the local German air defense network in support of Operation Varsity. Although twenty-four thousand artillery shells were fired over the course of twenty-two minutes at some one hundred targets, the mission was unsuccessful due to inaccurate targeting data and insufficient firepower.

In the Pacific Theater, the Japanese had made only limited progress in developing radar for air defense and what systems they did have were primitive and easy to avoid. Nevertheless, as the Americans began the bombing campaign against Japan there was concern over the large number of radar sites located on the home islands. For this purpose B-24 Liberators and B-29 Superfortresses were fitted with radar-homing devices to conduct "ferret" missions to locate and identify radar transmissions. The information brought back from these missions was used to outfit other B-29s with radar jammers and chaff to confuse Japanese air defense radars as they conducted their missions. B-25 Mitchells were also outfitted with radar-homing equipment and used to lead "hunter-killer" teams of other B-25s in locating and destroying Japanese early-warning radar sites.

Korean War
While there were some technological changes between World War II and the Korean War, many of the tactics for dealing with enemy air defenses remained the same.  For aircraft performing missions at low altitudes, AAA remained a constant danger; in fact, it was less dangerous for a UNC pilot to engage in air-to-air combat than it was to attack ground targets. The terrain and weather of the Korean Peninsula also contributed to the dangers associated with ground-attack missions.  Nevertheless, the advent of jet aircraft brought about many changes. Compared to propeller aircraft, jets were much faster, could climb more steeply, were more resistant to damage and were quieter in operation.  They were thus able to more effectively attack ground targets and escape, and while both jet- and propeller-driven aircraft participated in the Korean War the latter suffered heavier losses and were largely phased out by the end of the conflict.

As the war progressed, the Communists developed a highly centralized integrated air defense network, incorporating early-warning radars, ground-controlled interception (GCI) and AAA.  The potency of this network compelled UNC bombers to conduct bombing missions at altitudes beyond the reach of ground-based weapons, although this impacted the accuracy of their bombs.  The UNC also possessed an effective air defense network, but the North Korean Air Force had been largely destroyed early in the war and the Chinese Air Force was almost exclusively focused on the mission of air superiority rather than attacking UNC ground forces.

Vietnam War

The Vietnam War saw the evolution of what would become known as SEAD over the course of the conflict.  At the start of Operation Rolling Thunder, North Vietnam's air defenses were only dealt with in a piecemeal fashion, in spite of intelligence indicating that the North Vietnam Army was developing an integrated air defense system (IADS) dedicated to air deniability.  This included the construction of sixty SA-2 Guideline SAM sites by the end of 1965 which, though only accomplishing one hit for every thirteen missiles fired, were responsible for shooting down nearly 15% of American aircraft lost that year.  Early attempts to counter this system consisted of modified F-100 Super Sabres using crude homing equipment to locate and bomb radar-guided SAM and AAA sites, but these missions incurred heavy losses and the threat to American aircraft continued to grow. In 1966 a task force was put together to analyze the challenges presented by the NVA's air defense network and recommend ways to counter it. One of these was for aircraft to operate at low altitudes (below 500 meters) where the missiles were less effective. This also put the aircraft well within range of AAA, which would account for nearly 85% of all American aircraft losses during Rolling Thunder.

Eventually new SEAD-dedicated aircraft were introduced, the Air Force's EF-105F/F-105G Thunderchief and Navy's A-6B Intruder, which mounted more sophisticated detection equipment and carried the AGM-45 Shrike and AGM-78 Standard anti-radiation missiles (ARMs).  These fighter-bombers became very adept at tracking down and destroying ground-based air defense weapons, such that it became common for a vast majority of NVA SAM operators to turn off their radars whenever an F-105G was spotted.  While this prevented the SAM from physically being destroyed, it essentially accomplished the same mission of suppressing air defenses around the target.  Electronic warfare aircraft were also used to suppress air defenses by jamming NVA radars, with first the EB-66 Destroyer joined later by the EA-6B Prowler. By the end of Rolling Thunder these changes had caused a significant degradation in the effectiveness of SAMs: only one SA-2 missile out of every forty-eight fired resulted in a hit.  In spite of these changes, SEAD remained a primarily tactical function throughout Rolling Thunder, with American leadership either unaware or unappreciative of North Vietnam's IADS.

Losses suffered by F-105 Wild Weasels spurred on the development of a new variant based on the F-4C Phantom II, the EF-4C Phantom Wild Weasel IV.  The first thirty-six of these were delivered to Southeast Asia in 1969 and so missed taking part in Rolling Thunder. While carrying the same electronics as in the F-105G, the dense internal structure of the F-4 Phantom prevented the EF-4C from efficiently mounting this equipment, which meant it could not carry the superior AGM-78 Standard missile. By the start of Operation Linebacker, Wild Weasel missions were both more and less effective. Tactics and technology had evolved which improved the suppression of individual SAM sites, however the American military still failed to consider the integrated nature of North Vietnam's air defense network. Not only did the network possess thousands of radar- and optical-guided AAA and SAM sites, it also consisted of early-warning radars, intelligence-gathering agencies, and hundreds of ground-controlled interceptors.  Thus, while fewer American aircraft were lost to SAMs during Linebacker, many more were lost in air-to-air combat.

Operation Linebacker II started off similarly to Linebacker I with regards to SEAD tactics but was remarkable for the introduction of B-52 Stratofortress bombers in the defense-suppression role. During the early part of the operation, a combination of poor tactical employment and overconfidence on the part of Strategic Air Command resulted in the loss of a number of B-52s to SA-2 missiles, enough to force a rethink in how to counteract the enemy's air defenses.  The latter part of Linebacker II finally saw a concerted effort made to suppress the entire North Vietnamese IADS and significantly reduced the losses suffered. Only one SA-2 missile for every sixty-eight fired resulted in a hit, the lowest ratio of the entire war. The SEAD tactics displayed at the end of Linebacker II, involving the combination of traditional understanding of SEAD with electronic warfare and C3 countermeasures, laid the groundwork for future development.

Post-Vietnam Wars

With the phase-out of the F-105G, the US Air Force was in need of a new SEAD-dedicated aircraft  This effort was given more urgency in 1973 when, during the Yom Kippur War, Egypt employed a Soviet-built IADS that severely mauled the Israeli Air Force. After a series of tests, the new F-4G 'Wild Weasel V' first took flight in 1975 and became operational in 1978. Built on the F-4E airframe, the F-4G removed the M61 Vulcan pod to make room for specialized detection and jamming equipment and could carry the latest anti-radiation missile, the AGM-88 HARM. The F-4G Wild Weasel was then joined by EF-111A Raven and EC-130H Compass Call to become part of the USAF's "triad" of electronic combat aircraft. Each aircraft performed its own role in the overall mission of SEAD: the F-4G with seeking out and destroying enemy air defenses, the EC-130 with degrading the enemy's C3 capabilities, and the EF-111A with jamming enemy early-warning and target-acquisition radars.  Additional aircraft often part of SEAD missions included the E-3 Sentry, EC-130E Commando Solo and RC/EC-135.

On the other hand, the Soviets did not treat SEAD as an independent air operation but as a tactical role to be performed as part of a larger mission, namely an overwhelming air assault against NATO. This role was not carried out by SEAD-specific aircraft but normal bombers and fighter aircraft, such as the Tupolev Tu-16 and Tupolev Tu-22M, which could carry Soviet anti-radiation missiles. These aircraft would be organized into several strike groups whose mission was to lay down "chaff corridors" 40–50 kilometers across at intervals of 10 kilometers, including directly on top of suspected SAM sites. A small number of aircraft in these groups would be equipped with ARMs to physically destroy the sites. These missions were conducted against pre-planned targets which had been previously identified by signals intelligence and other reconnaissance efforts, rather than having aircraft seek out targets of opportunity. The closest the Soviets came to dedicated SEAD platforms were modified stand-off interceptors like the Mikoyan MiG-25BM and attack aircraft like the Sukhoi Su-24M.

The first example of a post-Vietnam SEAD campaign was by the United Kingdom during the 1982 Falklands War. The RAF Avro Vulcan B.Mk-2 was initially planned to be retired in early 1982 but the outbreak of the Falklands War, in April that year postponed it. The Falklands conflict was the only time that the Vulcan performed SEAD missions, flying very long-range missions against Port Stanley, armed with AGM-45 Shrike missiles mounted on makeshift underwing pylons and carrying a AN/ALQ-101 pod for jamming.

Shortly afterwards was Israel's Operation Mole Cricket 19, launched at the start of the 1982 Lebanon War. During the prior Yom Kippur War of 1973, Egyptian and Syrian SAM batteries proved to be costly to attack for the Israeli Air Force (IAF), such as during Operation Model 5; during the first three days of the war alone, the IAF lost 50 aircraft in about 1,220 sorties, a loss rate of four percent. The IAF found it challenging to provide air support to ground forces. Shortly after the conflict's end, the service stated a multiyear project, active between 1973 and 1978, specifically to devise an effective counter to the SAM threat. By 1982, the Bekaa Valley had been heavily reinforced by the Syrian Armed Forces with a modern Soviet-style air defense network consisting of multiple radar installations, GCI facilities, SAM and AAA sites, and a redundant C3 network. Prior to the start of the operation, Israel conducted an extensive intelligence-gathering effort, consisting of reconnaissance aircraft, remotely piloted vehicles (RPVs) and electronic surveillance aircraft, to paint an expansive picture of where Syrian air defense sites were located and which radar frequencies they were using.

Israel's attack on the SAMs was inadvertently assisted by the Syrians, who often placed their sites in sub-optimal positions and failed to relocate their equipment, use dummy radars or maintain active combat air patrol. When the operation began, efficient coordination of jamming/deception efforts with attacks against air defense sites effectively neutralized the ground component of the Bekaa Valley IADS. In response to the attacks, the Syrians launched a large number of fighter aircraft, however without the aid of their radar and GCI facilities, these forces were "flying blind" and suffered crippling losses in the resulting air-to-air combat. So complete and disturbing was the Israeli dismantling of the Bekaa Valley IADS that the deputy commander of the Soviet Air Defense Forces was sent to investigate what had gone wrong. Part of Israel's success was due to extensive reconnaissance and preparations prior to the battle, incompetence on the part of the Syrians, and desert conditions conducive to SEAD operations.

Operation El Dorado Canyon, the United States' response to the 1986 Berlin discotheque bombing, employed lessons learned from the Bekaa Valley campaign, including extensive planning and practice runs.  In contrast to the Israeli mission though the goal of El Dorado Canyon was not the destruction of Libya's IADS itself but to conduct a punitive strike against Muammar Gaddafi. Suppressing the IADS through non-lethal means would help accomplish this mission and, just as important after the Vietnam War, reduce casualties suffered by the strike group. For this reason, electronic jamming played a more prominent role in the operation than at Bekaa Valley and was carried out by both EF-111A Ravens and EA-6B Prowlers in the first ever joint US Air Force-Navy SEAD operation. For several reasons, F-4G Wild Weasels could not take part in El Dorado Canyon, requiring the use of the Navy's carrier-borne A-7E Corsair IIs and F/A-18 Hornets to attack Libyan SAM sites. Their lack of the Wild Weasel's specialized equipment required these fighters to fire their HARMs preemptively at Libyan SAM sites, a costly and wasteful method which nevertheless was effective due to the limited nature of the raid. For their part, the Libyans and their Soviet advisers had also learned lessons from the Bekaa Valley campaign: their IADS was constructed with multiple redundancies (including overlapping radar coverage and hardened landlines between defense sites) and a wider array of both Soviet and Western radar systems able to operate on multiple frequencies to avoid jamming. In the end, US forces succeeded in suppressing the Libyan IADS and conducted their punitive strike with minimal casualties suffered.

Gulf War

Coalition forces made extensive use of SEAD during the Gulf War against Iraq in order to counter its – at least on paper – formidable IADS. By 1990 Iraq was protected by approximately 3,700 SAMs, organized into 105 firing batteries, and approximately 7,000 AAA pieces, supported by hundreds of overlapping early warning, search and acquisition radars. In the air the Iraq Air Force was the sixth largest in the world, including hundreds of interceptors which were housed and protected within hardened bunkers. At the center of the Iraqi IADS was Kari, an automated command and control system developed by Iraq and built by French contractors in the wake of Operation Opera (Kari in turn is the French spelling of Iraq backwards). Kari tied the entire IADS to a single location, the national Air Defense Operations Center (ADOC) located in an underground bunker in Baghdad, and in turn divided the country into four defense sectors each overseen by a Sector Operations Center (SOC) located at H-3, Kirkuk, Taji and Talil; a fifth SOC was added at Ali Al Salem to cover the recently conquered Kuwait. Each SOC oversaw the local airspace and commanded anywhere from two to five Intercept Operations Centers (IOCs) per sector. The IOCs were located in bunkers constructed at Iraqi Air Force bases and tied into local radar systems, whose information they could pass on to their SOC and thence on to Baghdad. In this way a SOC was capable of simultaneously tracking 120 aircraft and selecting for the appropriate weapon system to engage them. The SOC could automatically target for SA-2 and SA-3 SAM systems in their sector, which meant the SAMs did not have to turn on their own radar and reveal their position, or an IOC could direct local interceptors to engage the targets. Baghdad itself was one of the most heavily defended cities in the world – more heavily defended several times over than Hanoi during the Vietnam War – protected by 65% of Iraq's SAMs and over half of its AAA pieces.

However, the Iraqi IADS had several fatal flaws of which Coalition air forces were able to take advantage.  The system was primarily oriented towards defending against much smaller attacks from Iraq's most likely enemies – Iran, Syria and Israel – and focused on point defense rather than area defense.  This meant there were significant gaps in its coverage, particularly on the orientation from Saudi Arabia straight to Baghdad, and attacking aircraft would be able to approach their target from multiple directions.  Much of the Iraqi air defense equipment was also quite outdated: Iraqi SA-2 and SA-3 systems were nearing the end of their operational lifespan and their countermeasures well known at this point, while what SA-6, SA-8 and Roland systems they possessed weren't much younger either.  Likewise a majority of Iraq's interceptor force were less-capable MiG-21s, with fewer more modern variants including export versions of the MiG-29 and F1 Mirage.  Furthermore, the IADS was centralized to a fault.  Although each IOC was datalinked to their respective SOC and in turn back to the ADOC, the defense sectors couldn't share information between each other.  If a SOC was knocked out of action the attached air defense weapons lost all ability to coordinate their response; its respective SAM batteries would be forced to rely on their own radar systems while most AAA guns lacked any radar guidance.  Training was also poor, with Iraqi pilots overly reliant on ground-control instructions such that if the IOCs were disabled they lost situation awareness and became easy targets.

Suppression of the Iraqi IADS played a prominent role in Operation Instant Thunder, the preliminary air campaign plan against Iraq which served as the basis for Operation Desert Storm's air campaign.  In its initial limited form, Instant Thunder called for three dedicated SEAD squadrons which would significantly degrade the IADS enough to allow decimating strikes against Iraq's military and political leadership and other strategic targets. This role for SEAD was further expanded as the mission grew in scope, involving a larger number of aircraft to completely destroy the air defenses protecting southern Iraq and Kuwait. Planning for this mission was helped when the CIA contacted the French engineer responsible for designing the Kari IADS and passed along information about its vulnerabilities and limitations. In its final form, Phase II of the Desert Storm air campaign sought to decimate the southern Iraqi IADS within two days of the start of hostilities.  F-4G Wild Weasels and other aircraft capable of carrying HARM missiles would destroy air defense sites themselves, electronic warfare aircraft would disrupt radars and other systems, and additional targets would be struck in order to support this mission, such as temporarily knocking out Iraq's electrical infrastructure. In addition to traditional SEAD systems the Persian Gulf War would also see the use of unconventional assets in knocking out Iraq's air defenses, in particular cruise missiles and F-117A Nighthawks, which would be used to attack sensitive targets.

The opening shots of Operation Desert Storm were fired on January 17 in pursuit of defense-suppression: at 2:20AM local time Task Force Normandy, a group of twelve American helicopters, infiltrated into Iraq with the goal of destroying two early-warning radar sites.  Three MH-53J Pave Lows guided nine AH-64 Apaches to the targets, which the gunships destroyed, opening a hole in the Iraqi IADS for the initial wave of aircraft to exploit.  Two F-117As knocked out the Nukhayb IOC, further widening the gap, although their next attack against the H-3 SOC was unsuccessful.  Among the first targets hit by F-117As attacking into Baghdad, bombs damaged the Al Taqaddum IOC and Talil SOC, shortly followed by Tomahawk strikes that disabled the electrical grid upon which Kari depended; reportedly some used special warheads filled with carbon fiber bundles to short-circuit the network.  For the next several hours dozens of Coalition aircraft poured into Iraq.  Those which weren't specifically directed to suppress air defenses had significant SEAD escort, including the use of BQM-74 drones and ADM-141 TALD decoys which would both "take the hit" for the manned airplanes and cause the Iraqis to reveal their position when they tracked or fired upon the lure.  The first night's largest sortie was a joint US Air Force-Navy SEAD mission consisting of fifty aircraft designed to look like a bombing raid on Baghdad but which instead were fitted out with decoys, drones and HARMs to destroy air defenses protecting the city.  With Kari degraded due to the disabling of the civilian electrical grid the Iraqi SAMs were forced to use their organic radar, producing what one pilot called "HARM Heaven".  A total of 67 HARMs were fired over the course of twenty minutes, causing a significant reduction in Iraqi air defenses around the capital based on follow-up missions.

Throughout the rest of the first night additional air-defense targets were hit by Coalition aircraft with varying levels of success while strikes against other targets consisted of a high ratio of SEAD and escort to strike aircraft.  This pace of attack against air-defense and other targets continued into the first day, involving a variety of different aircraft, and spread to targets in Kuwait.  A-10 Thunderbolt IIs were used to attack early-warning radars and similar sites along the border in operations known humorously as "Wart Weaseling" (a play on the Wild Weasel and the A-10 "Warthog" nicknames).  Unable to use Kari and fearful of turning their own radars on, Iraqi SAM operators resorted to firing their missiles with minimal or no guidance.  Furthermore, units of the Iraqi Army – even the elite Republican Guard – possessed inadequate SAM defenses by NATO or Soviet standards.  This allowed Coalition aircraft to attack them from the relative safety of higher altitudes. 

By the end of the first forty-eight hours of Desert Storm, the Coalition had achieved its goal of significantly degrading Kari, including the destruction of all air defenses in the south.  Although the Iraqis would replace most destroyed radars and bring back many IOCs and SOCs to at least partial operation, this was done so in an unorganized manner, with the Coalition continuing to bomb any reactivated sites.   In effect, combined with the failure of Iraq's air force to defend its airspace, the Coalition had gained air supremacy in the skies over Iraq from nearly the outset of the conflict.

This also put them beyond the effective range of most of Iraq's AAA pieces, which remained a threat. Baghdad's heavy AAA defenses also continued to make it a difficult target to attack, as Coalition forces found out during an attempted strike on January 19 against the Tuwaitha Nuclear Research Center. A variety factors, including the threat of AAA and ballistic SAMs, resulted in the strike's failure and loss of two aircraft.

By January 27, no C3 activity was detected at the SOC level by Coalition forces, and only limited activity at the IOC level.  At the end of the conflict, the DIA estimated Kari was operating at 25% its original capacity, and that it would take at least ten years to rebuild the system and another five to retrain the personnel needed to operate it.  In total, the SEAD campaign by the Coalition was an unequivocal success, allowing Coalition aircraft to fly at medium and high altitudes over Kuwait and Iraq with impunity.  The only losses Coalition aircraft suffered to Iraqi air defenses after the first two days occurred when they operated at low altitudes, primarily conducting close air support or other missions to assist ground forces.

Operation Allied Force

The bombing campaign of the Federal Republic of Yugoslavia during mid-1999, dubbed Operation Allied Force, was an overall success for NATO forces, but the mission to suppress Yugoslav air defenses proved to be more difficult than prior operations during the Gulf War. SEAD operations for NATO were principally carried out by the US Air Force, with fifty F-16CJ Block 50 Fighting Falcons, and the US Navy and Marines, with 30 EA-6B Prowlers; additional support was provided by Italian and German Tornado ECRs, a purpose-developed SEAD model. Many NATO aircraft were furnished with new towed decoys designed to lure away any missiles fired at them, and reportedly for the first time cyberwarfare was used to target Yugoslav air defense computer systems.

However, a number of deficiencies in NATO's SEAD operations were revealed during the course of the bombing campaign. The US Air Force had allowed its electronic warfare branch to atrophy in the years after the Gulf War, resulting in greater response times to engaging a SAM threat. Airspace restrictions and rules of engagement limited where NATO aircraft could fly and what targets they could hit, leaving some air defense systems untouched. Kosovo's mountainous terrain also made it difficult for NATO to locate and target Yugoslav air defenses, while at the same time the region's poor infrastructure limited where Yugoslav SAM and AAA sites could be placed. Furthermore, according to a post-conflict US intelligence report, Yugoslavia had a spy in NATO's headquarters in Brussels who in the early part of the conflict leaked flight plans and target details to the Yugoslav military, allowing Yugoslav military assets to be relocated to avoid detection; NATO responded by limiting the number of people with access to its plans, which appeared to be successful.

Yugoslavia had a much smaller IADS than Iraq during the Gulf War, but took greater steps at preserving it from NATO's bombing campaign. The Yugoslav integrated air defence system (IADS) was extensive, including underground command sites and buried landlines, which allowed for information to be shared between systems; thus, active radar in one area could target NATO aircraft for SAMs and AAA in another area with no active radar, further limiting NATO's ability to target air defences. By focusing on its operational survival, Yugoslav air defenses ceded a certain amount of air superiority to NATO forces. NATO reportedly fired 743 HARMs during the course of the 78-day campaign, but could confirm the destruction of only 3 of the original 25 SA-6 batteries. At the same time, over 800 SAMs were fired by Yugoslav forces at NATO aircraft, including 477 SA-6s and 124 confirmed MANPADS, for the downing of only two aircraft and several more damaged. That one of the two aircraft shot down was an F-117A Nighthawk marked the first combat loss ever of a stealth aircraft and typified some of the issues NATO faced during the campaign.

2003 US invasion of Iraq

At the onset of the Iraq War, Iraq's IADS was a fraction of what it had been during the Gulf War, though it was still one of the densest defense networks in the world. Over 200 SAM systems were still operational, mainly the older SA-2s, SA-3s and SA-6s, along with over 2,000 MANPADS and large numbers of AA guns. Improvements had been made to Kari, including greater usage of fiber optic cables, and more advanced equipment such as GPS guidance jammers were acquired. In addition to the ADOC and four original SOCs, a fifth SOC was created in Baghdad and specifically assigned to defend Saddam's palaces, the Republican Guards, and key security facilities.

Still, the defense network was relatively outdated and thus unable to seriously challenge the Coalition's dominance of Iraqi airspace, which had not only succeeded in suppressing Iraqi defenses during the Gulf War but continued to do so during the enforcement of Iraqi no-fly zones. Starting on March 1, aggressive "enforcement" of the no-fly zones accounted for the destruction of as many as a third of Iraq's missile launchers and radars by the time the invasion commenced on March 20. Numerous aircraft, such as the Panavia Tornado fighter-bomber, penetrated Iraqi airspace to conduct bombing raids during the opening phase of the conflict, striking at Iraqi installations.

During the course of the invasion, there were 1,660 reports of SAM launches and similar numbers of AAA firings, for the loss of very few aircraft. While Iraq largely failed to shoot down many Coalition aircraft, the sheer numbers of their air defenses still made them dangerous until the final stages of the invasion. This was true in particular for its large number of short-range missile and AAA weapons, which made low-altitude missions deadly and were harder to suppress.  Where possible, Coalition forces conducted stand-off strikes from outside the range of these defenses. The unsuccessful 2003 attack on Karbala exemplifies the dangers faced by aircraft operating at low altitudes around air defenses.

2022 Russian invasion of Ukraine

Many Ukrainian air defence facilities were reportedly destroyed or damaged in the first days of the invasion by Russian air strikes. On 5 March 2022, the Russian Air Force (VVS) declared that it had achieved air superiority, 11 days after the beginning of the invasion,  but not air supremacy. However, that same day, Russia lost at least ten aircraft. On 11 March 2022, retired United States Air Force Lieutenant General David Deptula stated in The New York Times that the Russian Air Force had not achieved air superiority, noting that supposedly vulnerable Ukrainian drones had continued to operate against Russian forces.

While several early air strikes on Yavoriv in Western Ukraine were performed by Russian bombers, their munitions were firing from a distance while flying within Russian air space, rather than entering Ukrainian air space; on 13 March 2022, dozens of air-launched cruise missiles were launched from within Russia to reach Western Ukraine, because it was allegedly too dangerous for the Russian Air Force to fly over Ukrainian space due to Ukrainian air defenses. Ukrainian mid-range SAM sites forced planes to fly low, making them vulnerable to Stinger and other shoulder-launched surface-to-air missiles, while a lack of training and flight hours for Russian pilots allegedly rendered them inexperienced for the type of close ground support missions typical of modern air forces. On 18 May 2022, near Izyum, a Russian Zhitel electronic warfare apparatus was detected, located, and disabled by Ukraine's ground and air forces.

On 30 August 2022, Command of Ukrainian Air Force (KpsZSU) released a video of its MiG-29 jets firing AGM-88 HARM missiles against Russian air defenses, one day after an alleged attack on Russian radar site for S-400 SAM batteries near Sevastopol in Russian-occupied Crimea. Earlier in the Summer, multiple Russian SAM batteries has been hit and the remains of AGM-88 missiles had been found on site. The U.S. government acknowledged the previously undisclosed transfer of AGM-88 missiles to Ukraine on August 8, 2022.

There are also suspicions of M31A1 GMLRS guided rockets firing from M142 HIMARS rocket artillery been used by Ukrainian military against Russian air defense systems.

On 15 February 2023 the International Institute for Strategic Studies (IISS) wrote that neither the Russian Air Force (VVS) nor the Ukrainian Air Force (KpsZSU) have gained air superiority.

Weapons

The weapons most often associated with this mission are anti-radiation missiles (ARMs), which work by homing in on radio emission sources like radar antennae.  These missiles are equipped with relatively small warheads, limiting collateral damage, but can easily destroy radar antennae and thus cripple an enemy's air defense system.  Early examples of ARMs could be fooled by turning off the radar system, which would cease emitting radiation for the missile to track; more recent missiles are fitted with fire-control systems which "remember" where the source was and continue towards that location. Anti-radiation missiles proved particularly effective during the Vietnam War where, despite the small number carried relative to other munitions, they accounted for 46% of all SA-2 batteries destroyed.

However, a weapon need not be designed specifically for SEAD missions to be used to damage or destroy a component of an air defense system. A Paveway LGB for example is not a SEAD-specific munition, but when used to destroy a radar antenna it still achieves the desired effect.  The American AGM-154 Joint Standoff Weapon is a valuable SEAD weapon due to its fairly long standoff range which allows the launching aircraft to avoid being threatened by all but the longest-range missiles, and its relatively large area of destruction against lightly armored targets.

Possibly the most effective type of unguided ("dumb") weapon used during SEAD strikes are cluster bombs. This is due to the fact many SAM sites are dispersed over a fairly wide area (in order to increase the difficulty of inflicting serious damage on the battery) and the relative "softness" of the targets (unarmored missile launchers, exposed radar antennas, etc.). The Mk-20 Rockeye II anti-armor cluster munition and the CBU-87 general-purpose cluster munition are typical examples of these types of weapons.

Artillery is also used to conduct SEAD missions. After World War II, the combined arms nature of warfare meant an increased role in ground forces performing SEAD missions in support of air operations.  During the Cold War the American military developed a joint definition of SEAD responsibilities, with the Army responsible for all SEAD missions within the range of observable fire and the Air Force for all missions further away. The Soviet Union placed less emphasis on using artillery to conduct SEAD missions, although where possible artillery would be used to clear a path for attack helicopters.  Because of their superior range, rocket artillery such as MLRS are the ideal weapon for conducting SEAD operations.

Loitering Munitions and Unmanned Aerial Vehicles (UAVs) play an increasingly vital role in conducting SEAD missions. Due to the dangerous nature of attacking air defenses, the use of UAVs can provide a more cost-effective and less risky method of conducting SEAD.  This is especially true since the pilot is not directly at risk and so a commander may be more willing to sacrifice UAVs to accomplish the mission. The first UAVs used in the SEAD role occurred during the Vietnam War, when versions of the Lightning Bug were adapted to carry chaff and other electronic countermeasures.  Modern examples of SEAD-specific loitering munitions include the IAI Harpy which loiters over areas with potential SAM activity, searches for SAM activity, and then crashes (with in-built warhead) into the target.

By country

, the main United States Air Force (USAF) SEAD aircraft is the F-16CJ Fighting Falcon following the retirement of the EF-111A Raven; while the United States Navy (USN) replaced the EA-6B Prowler with the Boeing EA-18G Growler. The Air Force and Navy in recent decades have emphasized multirole aircraft over dedicated single-role designs with aircraft such as the F/A-18E/F Super Hornet and F-15E Strike Eagle capable of carrying the AGM-88 HARM and fulfilling the SEAD mission.  The use of so-called "dumb planes" which lack the dedicated detection equipment of a true Wild Weasel is supposedly offset by their ability to carry a "smart missile" as well as perform a variety of missions besides SEAD, with a lower operating cost. However, there is concern that such platforms are less effective for this role because of the lack of specialized equipment, forcing them to employ expensive anti-radiation missiles in a less accurate and cost-effective manner. The advent of Fifth-generation fighters has seen somewhat of a return to dedicated role aircraft: while the F-22 Raptor is capable of carrying ground ordnance, the aircraft's primary mission is air superiority unlike the more balanced profile of the F-16 and F/A-18. The F-35 Lightning II is intended to fulfill the ground strike mission.

In European NATO air forces, the SEAD mission falls mostly to German Air Force Tornado Electronic Combat and Reconnaissance variant (ECR), and Aeronautica Militare (AMI) Tornado ECRs. Tornado ECRs employ the AGM-88 HARM missile in this role. Some modern SEAD aircraft are modified to equip some level of offensive jamming equipment to aid in the suppression of hostile surface to air missile systems (SAMs). However, the vast majority of SEAD aircraft are only equipped with defensive jamming systems to aid in self-protection against hostile SAMs or fighter aircraft.

Notes

References

External links

 U.S. Department of Defense definition
 Description of SEAD environment over Kosovo
 A 1976 discussion of differing opinions on (then) future threats to western aircraft 

Military doctrines
Aerial warfare strategy
Aerial warfare tactics
Military operations involving the United States
United States Air Force